The Chiquitano or Chiquitos are an indigenous people of Bolivia, with a small number also living in Brazil. The Chiquitano primarily live in the Chiquitania tropical savanna of Santa Cruz Department, Bolivia, with a small number also living in Beni Department and in Mato Grosso, Brazil. In the 2012 census, self-identified Chiquitanos made up 1.45% of the total Bolivian population or 145,653 people, the largest number of any lowland ethnic group. A relatively small proportion of Bolivian Chiquitanos speak the Chiquitano language. Many reported to the census that they neither speak the language nor learned it as children. The Chiquitano ethnicity emerged among socially and linguistically diverse populations required to speak a common language by the Jesuit Missions of Chiquitos.

Name
The name Chiquitos means "little ones" in Spanish. This ethnonym is commonly said to have been chosen by the Spanish Conquistadores, when they found the small doors of the Indian huts in the region. The Chiquitanos are also known as the Monkóx (plural: Monkoka), Chiquito or Tarapecosi people.

Language

Approximately 40,000 to 60,000 of Chiquitanos speak the Chiquitano language in Bolivia, making it the fourth most commonly spoken indigenous language in that country.  The language is a Chiquito language, possibly belonging to the Macro-Jê language family. Men's and women's speech differ from each other grammatically. The language is written in the Latin script. Several grammars for Chiquitano have been published, and four dialects have been identified: Manasi, Peñoqui, Piñoco, and Tao.

History
A variety of indigenous ethnic groups inhabited the Chiquitanía prior to Spanish arrival, which was marked by the 1559 founding of Santa Cruz de la Sierra at a point far to the east of the city's present location. Missionary contact was unsuccessful during the first nine decades of the 1600s.

The Chiquitos were in fact well formed and powerful, of middle height and of an olive complexion. They are an agricultural people, but made a gallant resistance to the Spaniards for nearly two centuries. In 1691, however, they made the Jesuit missionaries welcome, and rapidly became civilized. The Chiquito language was adopted as the means of communication among the converts, who soon numbered 50,000, representing nearly fifty tribes.

The formative experience of the Chiquitano ethnicity was their common evangelization and confinement to towns under the authority of Jesuit missionaries from their 1692 arrival at San Javier de los Piñocas (in what is now Ñuflo de Chávez Province) until their 1767 expulsion from Spanish colonial possessions. Missions governed settlements known as reductions at San Javier de los Piñocas, Concepción, San Ignacio, Santa Ana, San Rafael, San José, San Juan, Santiago, Santo Corazón, and San Miguel. Each mission town incorporated one to three thousand residents. Jesuits emphasized prayer and work as the main activities of a worthy life. They promoted permanent settlements, cattle husbandry, and loom-based weaving as aspects of economic life. The reductions also began a centuries-long pattern of Chiquitano Indian labor benefiting outsiders. During the mission period, Chiquitanos were also recruited as soldiers in Spanish colonial wars. Swedish anthropologist Erland Nordenskiöld described the Jesuit legacy as follows: "The Jesuits protected the Indians from other whites, but divested them of their freedom and made them so dependent that after the expulsion of the missionaries they were easy prey for unscrupulous whites. Actually they set the stage for the extinction of many Indian tribes."

Following the Jesuits' expulsion, some Chiquitanos were incorporated into mestizo-owned ranches and farms, where they served as unfree laborers; others retreated from the villages, living in smaller camps. The rubber boom across South America brought a new industry to the region from 1880 to 1945, staffed once again by Chiquitano laborers. Work was often involuntary, and the conditions extremely harsh, resulting in deaths from workplace accidents, malnutrition, "diseases such as malaria, beriberi, and scurvy; and the overall exploitative practices of the whites." As rubber workers, Chiquitanos experienced debt peonage and forced labor, but were primarily rented out by wealthy mestizos on whom they were dependent. Chiquitanos also built parts of the Santa Cruz–Corumbá Railway under this arrangement.

Political organization 

In Bolivia, the Chiquitano people are represented by the organization Chiquitano Indigenous Organization (Organización Indígena Chiquitana, OICH). OICH is led by José Bailaba, who serves as Cacique Mayor.

In Brazil, the Chiquitano are trying to obtain their own indigenous territory.

See also
Jesuit Missions of Chiquitos
List of the Jesuit Missions of Chiquitos

Notes

External links 
 Pueblo Chiquitano , Santa Cruz Departmental government website (Spanish).
 Chiquitano weapons, National Museum of the American Indian

Indigenous peoples of the Amazon
Indigenous peoples in Bolivia
Indigenous peoples in Brazil
Jesuit Missions of Chiquitos